Strabomantis bufoniformis is a species of frog in the family Strabomantidae. It is found in western Colombia (including Gorgona Island), Panama, and south-eastern Costa Rica. It is sometimes known as the rusty robber frog.

Description

Habitat and conservation
Its natural habitats are riparian habitats in primary lowland moist and wet forests; it has only been found in mature forests. It is a nocturnal species.

Strabomantis bufoniformis is uncommon throughout its range, with the exception of Gorgona Island where it is quite common. It may have disappeared from Costa Rica where it has not been seen since 1978. It is classified as "endangered".

References

bufoniformis
Amphibians of Colombia
Amphibians of Costa Rica
Amphibians of Panama
Amphibians described in 1896
Taxonomy articles created by Polbot